Warren Bryant was the CEO of Longs Drugs Store Corporation out of California prior to the retail chain's acquisition by CVS/Caremark. Hired in 2002 to Longs, he was Senior Vice President of The Kroger Company., a retail grocery chain, from 1999 to 2002. Prior to that, from 1996 to 1999, he was President and Chief Executive Officer of Dillon Companies, Inc., a retail grocery chain and subsidiary of The Kroger Co. He is also a director of OfficeMax Incorporated.

See also
 Longs Drugs
 The Kroger Company
 Dillon Companies
 OfficeMax

External links
  Warren Bryant's bio at Forbes.com

Living people
Year of birth missing (living people)